John A. Baden is founder and chairman of the Foundation for Research on Economics and the Environment (FREE) based in Bozeman, Montana. In addition to FREE. he cofounded the Property and Environment Research Center (PERC),  the Environmental Management MBA program at the University of Washington, and Warriors and Quiet Waters. He has taught at Indiana University, Montana State University, Utah State University, and the University of Washington. Baden and his wife, Ramona Marotz-Badem, own a ranch in Gallatin Gateway, outside Bozeman, Montana. 

In 1977 Baden co-authored Managing the Commons with Garrett Hardin, the author of the essay "The Tragedy of the Commons". The book, which is  out of print, is a collection of articles exploring the themes raised in Hardin's original essay.

Bibliography

Table of Contents of Managing the Commons, by Garrett Hardin and John Baden (editors)

 What Marx Missed, Garrett Hardin
 On the Checks to Population, William Forster Lloyd
 The Tragedy of the Commons, Garrett Hardin
 Intuition First, Then Rigor, Garrett Hardin
 An Algebraic Theory of the Commons, H.V. Muhsam
 A Model of the Commons, Jay M. Anderson
 Denial and Disguise, Garrett Hardin
 The Tragedy of the Commons Revisited, Beryl L. Crowe
 An Operational Analysis of "Responsibility", Garrett Hardin
 Killing the Goose, Daniel Fife
 The Economics of Overexploitation, Colin W. Clark
 A Test of the Tragedy of the Commons, James A. Wilson
 Ethical Implications of Carrying Capacity, Garrett Hardin
 Rewards of Pejoristic Thinking, Garrett Hardin
 A Primer for the Management of Common Pool Resources, John Baden
 The Social Costs of Reducing Social Cost, Gordon Tullock
 A Theory for Institutional Analysis of Common Pool Problems, Vincent Ostrom and Elinor Ostrom
 Collective Action and the Tragedy of the Commons, Elinor Ostrom
 Communes and the Logic of the Commons, Kari Bullock and John Baden
 From Free Grass to Fences: Transforming the Commons of the American West, Terry L. Anderson and P. J. Hill
 Environmental Resource Management: Public or Private? Robert L. Bish
 Property Rights, Environmental Quality, and the Management of National Forests, John Baden and Richard Stroup
 Neospartan Hedonists, Adult Toy Aficionados, and the Rationing of Public Lands, John Baden
 Population, Ethnicity, and Public Goods: The Logic of Interest-Group Strategy, John Baden
 Living on a Lifeboat, Garrett Hardin
 Commons and Community: The Idea of a Public,  Kenneth E. Boulding

References

External links
 Baden's bio, from FREE's website
 An extensive list of Baden's columns from 1989 to the present

Living people
People from Bozeman, Montana
Year of birth missing (living people)